The Cincinnati Mighty Ducks were a professional ice hockey team based in Cincinnati, Ohio. They were members of the American Hockey League, and played their home games at the Cincinnati Gardens. Throughout their existence they were the primary minor league affiliate of the Mighty Ducks of Anaheim of the National Hockey League, with a three-year shared affiliation with the Detroit Red Wings.

History
In 1997, the Baltimore Bandits franchise was losing money and accruing debts in Baltimore. Jerry Robinson, owner of the Cincinnati Gardens arena, purchased the Bandits franchise to play at the Gardens, replacing the previous hockey tenant, the Cincinnati Cyclones of the International Hockey League. The Mighty Ducks of Anaheim signed Cincinnati to a five-year affiliate agreement. From 1999 through 2002 team shared its affiliation with the Detroit Red Wings, until the Red Wings affiliated with the Grand Rapids Griffins. Anaheim maintained their affiliation with Cincinnati through the 2004-05 season. The Cincinnati Mighty Ducks were granted a voluntary suspension for the 2005–06 season two days after Anaheim and Cincinnati ended their affiliation, and Cincinnati could not find a replacement NHL affiliate. In October 2005, the team was renamed the Cincinnati RailRaiders, and was seeking an affiliation agreement for a return in 2006-07 season, but failed to reach a goal of 2,000 season tickets sold to become re-active.

On October 3, 2006, it was reported that a Windsor, Ontario-based company had been granted conditional approval to purchase and relocate the team, however that deal fell through. On March 19, 2007, the AHL announced that the team had been purchased, and moved to Rockford, Illinois, to become the Rockford IceHogs.

The market was previously served by:
 Cincinnati Mohawks (1949–1952 AHL, 1952–1958 IHL)
 Cincinnati Wings (1963–1964 CHL)
 Cincinnati Swords (1971–1974 AHL)
 Cincinnati Stingers (1975–1979 WHA, 1979–1980 CHL)
 Cincinnati Tigers (1981–1982 CHL)
 Cincinnati Cyclones (1990–1992 ECHL, 1992–2001 IHL, 2001–2004 ECHL)
The team was replaced in this market by:
Cincinnati Cyclones of the ECHL (2006–present)
Affiliates
Mighty Ducks Of Anaheim (1997-2005)
Detroit Red Wings (1999-2002)

Season-by-season results

Regular season

Playoffs

Notable players and coaches
Numerous Cincinnati Mighty Ducks alumni were with the Anaheim Ducks when they won the Stanley Cup in 2007. In addition, former coach Mike Babcock led Anaheim to a Stanley Cup Final appearance in 2003 before he went to Detroit.

Sean Avery
Mike Babcock
Tim Brent
Sheldon Brookbank
Ilya Bryzgalov
Dan Bylsma
Marc Chouinard
Mike Commodore
Matt Cullen
Kurtis Foster
Ryan Getzlaf
Jean-Sebastien Giguere
Curtis Glencross
Zenon Konopka
Tomas Kopecky
Chris Kunitz
Maxim Kuznetsov
Joffrey Lupul
Tony Martensson
Andy McDonald
Shane O'Brien
Samuel Pahlsson
Pierre-Alexandr Parenteau
Richard Park
Dustin Penner
Corey Perry
Ruslan Salei
Bob Wren
Chris Mason

Team records

Single season
Goals: 42  Bob Wren (1997–98)
Assists: 59  Craig Reichert (1997–98)
Points: 100 Bob Wren (1997–98)
Penalty minutes: 319  Shane O'Brien (2004–05)
GAA: 2.07  Frederic Cassivi (2004–05)
SV%: .924 Frederic Cassivi (2004–05)

Career
Career goals: 113 Bob Wren
Career assists: 186 Bob Wren
Career points: 299 Bob Wren
Career penalty minutes: 482 Shane O'Brien
Career goaltending wins: 76  Ilya Bryzgalov
Career shutouts: 19 Ilya Bryzgalov
Career games: 277 Bob Wren

References

External links
The Internet Hockey Database - Cincinnati Mighty Ducks
SCSR / Cincinnati Mighty Ducks

 
1997 establishments in Ohio
2005 disestablishments in Ohio
Anaheim Ducks minor league affiliates
Ice hockey clubs established in 1997
Ice hockey teams in Ohio
Sports clubs disestablished in 2005
Sports teams in Cincinnati